Danique Braam (born 5 September 1995) is a Dutch professional racing cyclist, who currently rides for UCI Women's Continental Team .

Major results
2022 
 7th Leiedal Koerse
 9th Ronde de Mouscron

References

External links
 

1995 births
Living people
Dutch female cyclists
Place of birth missing (living people)
Sportspeople from Leeuwarden
Cyclists from Friesland
21st-century Dutch women